Polygaloides is a genus of flowering plants belonging to the family Polygalaceae.

Species
, Plants of the World Online accepted the following species:
Polygaloides balansae (Coss.) O.Schwarz
Polygaloides chamaebuxus (L.) O.Schwarz
Polygaloides munbyana (Boiss. & Reut.) O.Schwarz
Polygaloides paucifolia (Willd.) J.R.Abbott
Polygaloides vayredae (Costa) O.Schwarz
Polygaloides webbiana (Coss.) O.Schwarz

References

Polygalaceae
Fabales genera